Hunter Street is a comedy adventure television series created by Reint Schölvinck and Melle Runderkamp that aired on Nickelodeon from March 11, 2017 to February 23, 2018, and on TeenNick from July 29 to September 27, 2019. The series stars Stony Blyden, Mae Mae Renfrow, Kyra Smith, Thomas Jansen, and Daan Creyghton as a group of five foster children who must solve a mystery in order to find their missing foster parents. Wilson Radjou-Pujalte and Kate Bensdorp join the cast in the series' second season, and Eliyha Altena and Sarah Nauta join the cast in the series' third season. A fourth season was produced, however, it did not premiere in the United States, airing in the United Kingdom from April 19 to May 20, 2021.

Premise 
Five foster children in Amsterdam attempt to find out what happened to their missing foster parents.

Episodes

Cast

Main 
 Stony Blyden as Max (seasons 1–2)
 Mae Mae Renfrow as Tess (seasons 1–2)
 Kyra Smith as Anika
 Thomas Jansen as Daniel (seasons 1–2; recurring, season 4)
 Daan Creyghton as Sal (seasons 1–3)
 Wilson Radjou-Pujalte as Jake (season 2; recurring, season 3)
 Kate Bensdorp as Evie (seasons 2–4)
 Eliyha Altena as Oliver (seasons 3–4)
 Sarah Nauta as Jasmyn (season 3; recurring, season 4)

Recurring 

 Ronald Top as Erik Hunter
 Tooske Ragas as Kate Hunter
 Yootha Wong-Loi-Sing as Simone (seasons 1–2)
 Zoë Harding as Sophie (seasons 1–2)
 Barnaby Savage as Tim (seasons 1–2)
 Kees Hulst as Rinus Saganash (seasons 1–2)
 Tillman Galloway as Mr. "Magpie" Browning (seasons 1–3)
 Dawn Mastin as Gertrude (seasons 1–2)
 Liora Kats as Janine Bruhl (seasons 1)
 Eva Van Der Gucht as  Headmistress Clutterbeek  (seasons 1–2)
 Amedeo Feingold as Julius Bruhl (season 1)
 Debra Mulholland  as Hedwig Hunter (season 1)
 Alyssa Guerrouche as Jennie (seasons 2, 4)
 Mark Wijsman as Jerry (season 2)
 Loveday Smith as Diane (seasons 2–4)
 Michael de Roos as Simon (season 2, 4)
 Bonnie Williams as Lucia Jansen (season 2)
 Kenneth Darryll Charles as Martin (season 2)
 Kenan Raven as Bernard (season 2)
 Cystine Carreon as Dottie (seasons 3–4)
 Thomas Cammaert as Markus (seasons 3–4)
 Edwin Jonker as Lyman (season 3)
 Charlie May as Rex Legend (season 3)
 Meriyem Manders as Officer Smith (season 3)
 Padraig Turley as Florian (season 4)
 Reiky de Valk as Josh (season 4)
 Mimi Ferrer as Miss Lucas (season 4)
 Max Van Kreij as Mr. Simmons (season 4)
 Myrthe Burger as Isabelle Jackson (season 4)
 Jakob Nieuwenhuijsen as Alex Jackson (season 4)

Production 
The series is produced in the Netherlands by Blooming Media, and was co-developed with the Nickelodeon Netherlands television series De Ludwigs. Nickelodeon made it known that the series' first season would contain 20 episodes on March 2, 2017. The series was renewed for a second season of 20 episodes on April 25, 2017. On July 27, 2018, the series was renewed for a third season of 30 episodes. On May 12, 2019, it was announced that the third season would premiere on Nickelodeon on July 22, 2019, but the third season later premiered on TeenNick on July 29, 2019.

Release 
On June 25, 2018, it was announced that Hunter Street would stream on Hulu.

Ratings 
 

| link2             = List of Hunter Street episodes#Season 2 (2018)
| episodes2         = 20
| start2            = 
| end2              = 
| startrating2      = 0.81
| endrating2        = 0.89
| viewers2          = |2}} 

| link3             = List of Hunter Street episodes#Season 3 (2019)
| network3          = TeenNick
| episodes3         = 26
| start3            = 
| end3              = 
| startrating3      = 0.11
| endrating3        = 0.16
| viewers3          = |2}} 
}}

References

External links 
 

2010s American children's comedy television series
2010s Nickelodeon original programming
2020s Nickelodeon original programming
2017 American television series debuts
2019 American television series endings
American children's adventure television series
English-language television shows
Television shows set in Amsterdam